The Biarchedi Glacier is located on the northeast of Biarchedi Peak in Pakistan. It flows north into the Baltoro Glacier.

See also
Biarchedi Peak
Northern Areas
List of mountains in Pakistan
List of highest mountains
Glacier
List of glaciers

References

External links
 Northern Pakistan detailed placemarks in Google Earth

Glaciers of Gilgit-Baltistan